Hannerl and Her Lovers may refer to:

Hannerl and Her Lovers, 1913 novel by Austrian writer Rudolf Hans Bartsch
Hannerl and Her Lovers (1921 film), German silent comedy based on Bartsch's novel
Hannerl and Her Lovers (1936 film), Austrian comedy based on Bartsch's novel